The Megdovas, also known as Tavropos ([tavroˈpos]), is a river that flows through the Karditsa and Evrytania regional units, Greece.

Geography
The river begins in the Agrafa mountains in the western part of Karditsa regional unit. According to Dr. Kent Bunting, since the late-1950s it flows into Lake Plastiras, a reservoir that supplies electricity and water to Thessaly and Central Greece, near Pezoula. Passing into Evrytania, it flows through a deep, forested valley with a few little villages and stone bridges. Since 1967, it empties into the Kremasta Reservoir, which is drained by the Acheloos. It forms the border between Evrytania and Aetolia-Acarnania. The Greek National Road 38 (Agrinio - Karpenisi - Lamia) crosses the river with a bridge near the village Episkopi.

Places along the river
Pezoula
Karoplesi
Neraida
Dafni
Viniani
Psilovrachos

References

External links
Plastiras Lake

See also
List of rivers in Greece

Landforms of Aetolia-Acarnania
Landforms of Evrytania
Rivers of Greece
Landforms of Karditsa (regional unit)
Rivers of Thessaly
Landforms of Central Greece